The Lair House is a historic house at Stone and Elm Streets in Holly Grove, Arkansas.  It is a -story wood-frame structure, with a complex roof line with two forward gables joined by a horizontal crossing section.  The gables rest on projecting window bays, with a small gable-roofed porch between at the attic level.  The exterior and interior have retained a wealth of Queen Anne woodwork, despite the conversion of its front porch to a more Craftsman-style appearance.  Built about 1905, it is one of Holly Grove's finest examples of Queen Anne architecture.

The house was listed on the National Register of Historic Places in 1998.

See also
National Register of Historic Places listings in Monroe County, Arkansas

References

Houses on the National Register of Historic Places in Arkansas
Queen Anne architecture in Arkansas
Houses in Monroe County, Arkansas
National Register of Historic Places in Monroe County, Arkansas